Fiherenana is a river in the region Atsimo-Andrefana in southern Madagascar. It flows into the Indian Ocean at Tulear.

Due to a local fady (taboo), pirogues are not allowed on this river.

References

Rivers of Atsimo-Andrefana
Rivers of Madagascar